The RTVE Symphony Orchestra (Orquesta Sinfónica de Radio Televisión Española), also known as the Spanish Radio and Television Symphony Orchestra is a Spanish radio orchestra servicing RTVE, the Spanish national broadcasting network.

The Orchestra is based at the Teatro Monumental in Madrid, Spain.

Conductors
Pablo González (2019–)
Miguel Ángel Gómez Martínez (2016–2019)
Carlos Kalmar (2011–2016)
Adrian Leaper (2001–2010)
Enrique García Asensio (1998–2001)
Sergiu Comissiona (1990–1998)
Arpad Joó (1988–1990)
Miguel Ángel Gómez Martínez (1984–1987)
Odón Alonso (1968–1984)
Enrique García Asensio (1965–1984)
Antoni Ros-Marbà (1965–1967)

Principal guest conductors
 Miguel Ángel Gómez Martínez 
 Antoni Ros-Marbà (1988–1991)
 David Shallon (1997–1999)

See also 
 Community of Madrid Orchestra
 Madrid Symphony Orchestra
 Spanish National Orchestra
 Queen Sofía Chamber Orchestra
 Teatro Real
 National Auditorium of Music
 Teatro Monumental
 Zarzuela

References

External links
Homepage

Spanish symphony orchestras
Radio and television orchestras
RTVE
Mass media in Madrid
Culture in Madrid
Musical groups established in 1965
1965 establishments in Spain